Domenique Davis is (born February 28, 1996) is an American football defensive tackle for the Cincinnati Bengals of the National Football League (NFL). He played college football at UNC Pembroke Braves.

Professional career
Davis signed with the Bengals on July 26. He was cut on August 30, but signed to the practice squad the next day. On October 31 Davis was elevated to the active roster ahead of a Monday Night showdown against the Cleveland Browns. Later that day he made his debut playing 20 snaps and recording 2 tackles. On November 5 Davis signed to the Active Roster. He signed a reserve/future contract on January 31, 2023.

References

External links
UNC Pembroke bio
Cincinnati Bengals bio

1996 births
Living people
American football defensive tackles
Cincinnati Bengals players
Houston Gamblers (2022) players
UNC Pembroke Braves football players